Josiah "Tink" Thompson (b. 17 January 1935) is an American writer, retired professional private investigator, and former philosophy professor. In 1967, he published both The Lonely Labyrinth, a study of Kierkegaard's pseudonymous works, and Six Seconds in Dallas: A Micro-Study of the Kennedy Assassination. The culmination of his half-century-long Kennedy assassination project, updating his own and others’ investigative work, correcting certain errors, and reconciling the whole body of valid forensic and eyewitness evidence, was published in early 2021 as Last Second in Dallas.

Early life and professional careers
Thompson was born and raised in East Liverpool, Ohio. He graduated from Yale University in 1957 and immediately entered the Navy, serving in Underwater Demolition Team 21. Returning to Yale, Thompson earned his Ph.D. in 1964. He joined the Yale faculty as Instructor in Philosophy and then moved on to teach at Haverford College. He remained at Haverford, including a period living and researching in Denmark, until 1976.  He wrote or edited several works about Danish philosopher Søren Kierkegaard.

In 1976 Thompson left Haverford and moved to San Francisco, to begin a new career as a private investigator, first working for Hal Lipset and then David Fechheimer.  Thompson worked as a PI for thirty-five years, retiring in 2011.  He worked mostly in criminal cases, including the investigation of dozens of murders. Among his better-known cases were participation in the defense of Bill and Emily Harris in the Patty Hearst kidnapping, and of Chol Soo Lee on murder charges. He was appointed by the federal court as investigator on the defense team for Timothy McVeigh in the Oklahoma City bombing trial, and investigated the bombing attack on environmental activists Judi Bari and Darryl Cherney. 

In 1988, he published Gumshoe: Reflections in a Private Eye, a well-received memoir discussing his post-academic life as a private detective.

Since 1976, Thompson has lived with his wife, Nancy, in Bolinas, California, a seaside village just north of San Francisco. He serves as registered agent for the Bolinas Cemetery Corporation, defending the 150-year-old graveyard from vandals, litterbugs and developers. Their daughter, Lis, died of breast cancer in 2015. Their son, Everson, practices as a criminal defense private investigator in San Rafael, California.

Six Seconds in Dallas (1967)
In Six Seconds in Dallas, Thompson argued that the physical evidence available as of 1967, corroborating eye-witness accounts, showed that multiple shooters fired within the same few seconds at President Kennedy in Dallas on November 22, 1963. Fred Winship of the AP wrote that "some of Thompson's conclusions are based on original research in the National Archives, documents and photos not seen by the Warren Commission and interviews with eyewitnesses."

The book was condensed in the Saturday Evening Post issue for December 2, 1967, generating news stories in both the New York Times and Newsweek. John Updike wrote a “Talk of the Town” piece for The New Yorker about “the Umbrella Man” (12/9/67) and described Six Seconds as “absolutely fascinating. It convinced me who’s never been a conspiracy man at all that the whole thing must be rethought.”  Max Lerner devoted his syndicated New York Post column on November 27, 1967 to describing the book as “more careful and more powerful than the Warren Report.  It was not until this book that I became clear in my mind about some kind of collaborative shooting.” 

Time, Inc. sued Thompson and his publisher for infringement of copyright because of Zapruder frames sketched in the book. A federal court gave summary judgment to Thompson and his publisher ten months later in a landmark decision stressing fair use rights.

Last Second in Dallas (2021)
After many years of additional research and investigation of all available evidence, bringing to bear the latest developments in forensic science in such areas as acoustics, ballistics, crime scene reconstruction, and examination of cameras and photographs, Thompson completely revised his seminal work and to some extent its conclusions. Combined with personal memoirs and accounts of twists and turns in his investigation of the case, the 475-page, profusely illustrated result (361 pages of text, plus appendix, extensive notes and index), Last Second in Dallas, was published by the University Press of Kansas in February 2021. 

In 1979, twelve years after publication of Six Seconds in Dallas, Thompson was hired to write part of a new book on the then-just-released House Select Committee on Assassinations (HSCA) Report. His assignment was to evaluate the part of the House Report dealing with the physical facts of what happened in Dealey Plaza. He gave up that project in frustration, the new book explains, when it became clear that the core evidence in the case, as then understood, was internally contradictory. Confronting an apparent impasse, he turned away from the case and did not return to it until 2011.

During the intervening 32 years, Thompson recounts in Last Second, the corpus of reliable evidence in the case changed. With respect to the forensic evidence in particular, advances in scientific research with regard to both acoustics and ballistics removed what had been thought to be major facts from the table of genuine evidence, by showing them to be mistaken. Last Second in Dallas weaves together the remaining, scientifically verifiable facts into a picture of singular simplicity.  

Thompson relies not only on the Zapruder film and the police radio dictabelt recording of the shooting (which he shows to be valid), but also begins the book by quoting the reports of numerous witnesses he interviewed for LIFE magazine in 1966 and 1967. At the end it becomes apparent that the cleansed forensic arguments confirm what numerous eye-witnesses reported just after the shooting in November 1963. 

Throughout the book, Thompson emphasizes and scrutinizes the raw facts of the case. In the last second of the shooting, the presidential limousine is at its closest approach to Zapruder’s camera, allowing a precise and detailed examination of the images. The last two shots can unmistakenly be seen hitting their target, and these impacts match exactly the timing of the shots heard on the sound recording. 
When first struck in the head at Zapruder frame 313, almost five seconds after the initial burst of gunfire which had already wounded Kennedy and Texas Governor Connally, the President is thrown backwards and to the left. Riding to the limousine's left rear are two Dallas Police motorcycle outriders who experience brain and blood debris blown over them at high velocity. The new book subjects this next-to-last (and fatal) shot to a particularly exacting acoustic examination. Less than a second later at frame 328, when Kennedy is hit in the head a second time, from the rear, his body and head are catapulted directly forward, with blood and brain blasted as far forward as the car’s hood ornament.  

In Last Second, as in Six Seconds some 54 years earlier, Thompson eschews all speculation as to who the conspirators may have been as well as their motives. Focusing on the final second, he explains how it can be known with great certainty that Kennedy was hit twice in the head, just 0.71 seconds apart, by bullets fired from diametrically opposed directions. The first of these final and equally non-survivable shots came from behind a stockade fence atop the grassy knoll and not from the Texas School Book Depository, where Lee Harvey Oswald was located.

The Umbrella Man
In 2011, The New York Times posted a short documentary film by Errol Morris featuring Thompson's commentary about the "Umbrella Man", a man holding a black umbrella during the assassination of Kennedy. In this interview, Thompson deploys both his philosophical and his criminal investigative skills to elucidate the difference between logical inferences premised on facts and speculative conspiratorial theorizing.

Bibliography

 The Lonely Labyrinth; Kierkegaard's Pseudonymous Works (Southern Illinois University Press, 1967)
 Six Seconds in Dallas: A Micro-Study of the Kennedy Assassination (B. Geis Associates, 1967) 
 Kierkegaard: A Collection of Critical Essays (editor) (Anchor, 1972) 
 Kierkegaard (Knopf, 1973) 
 Gumshoe: Reflections in a Private Eye (Little, Brown, 1988) 
 Last Second in Dallas (University Press of Kansas, 2020)

References

Yale University alumni
Haverford College faculty
Scholars of modern philosophy
Living people
Private detectives and investigators
Researchers of the assassination of John F. Kennedy
American male writers
1935 births